Sir William Ewart, 1st Baronet (22 November 1817 – 1 August 1889) was an Irish linen manufacturer and Unionist politician who sat in the House of Commons from 1878 to 1889.

Ewart was the son of William Ewart of Sydenham Park County Down. He was educated at the Belfast Academy. He was a linen manufacturer and merchant and became president of the Irish Linen Trade Association. In 1859 he was mayor of Belfast and was also some time a member of the Belfast Local Marine Board. He was a magistrate for Antrim and Belfast.

Ewart was Member of Parliament (MP) for Belfast from 1878 until the constituency was divided under the Redistribution of Seats Act 1885, and then for the Northern Division of Belfast until his death, at which point Sir Edward Harland, Bt. was elected unopposed. Ewart was created a baronet on 13 September 1887, of Glenmachan House, in the parish of Holywood in the County of Down and of Glenbank, in the parish of Belfast in the County of Antrim.

He was one of the Directors of the XIT Ranch, located in the Texas Panhandle.

Ewart married Isaella Kelso Mathewson daughter of Lavens Mathewson of Newtownstewart, County Tyrone.

References

External links 
 

1817 births
1889 deaths
Baronets in the Baronetage of the United Kingdom
Irish Conservative Party MPs
UK MPs 1874–1880
UK MPs 1880–1885
UK MPs 1885–1886
UK MPs 1886–1892
Members of the Parliament of the United Kingdom for Belfast constituencies (1801–1922)
Businesspeople from Belfast
Mayors of Belfast
19th-century Irish businesspeople